Monoxenus turrifer is a species of beetle in the family Cerambycidae. It was described by Per Olof Christopher Aurivillius in 1914.

References

turrifer
Beetles described in 1914